Burnaby—Douglas was a federal electoral district  in the province of British Columbia, Canada, that was represented in the House of Commons of Canada from 1997 to 2012.

History
This electoral district was created in 1996 from New Westminster—Burnaby and Burnaby—Kingsway ridings.

Portions of Vancouver South—Burnaby and New Westminster—Coquitlam—Burnaby have been added to it since.

The 2012 electoral redistribution dissolved this riding and incorporated it into Burnaby North—Seymour and Burnaby South for the 2015 election.

Members of Parliament

This riding elected the following Members of Parliament:

Election results

See also
 List of Canadian federal electoral districts
 Past Canadian electoral districts

References

 Library of Parliament Riding Profile
 Expenditures - 2008
 Expenditures - 2004
 Expenditures - 2000
 Expenditures - 1997

Notes

External links
 Website of the Parliament of Canada

Former federal electoral districts of British Columbia
Federal electoral districts in Greater Vancouver and the Fraser Valley
Politics of Burnaby